{{chembox
| Watchedfields = changed
| verifiedrevid = 470614378
| ImageFile = N1,N1'-(ethane-1,2-diyl)bis(ethane-1,2-diamine) 200.svg
| ImageFile_Ref = 
| ImageSize = 220
| ImageName = Skeletal formula of triethylenetetramine
| ImageFile1 = Triethylenetetramine-3D-balls.png
| ImageFile1_Ref = 
| ImageSize1 = 220
| ImageName1 = Ball and stick model of triethylenetetramine
| ImageFile2 = Triethylenetetramine-3D-spacefill.png
| ImageFile2_Ref = 
| ImageSize2 = 220
| ImageName2 = Spacefill model of triethylenetetramine
| PIN = N1,N1′-(Ethane-1,2-diyl)di(ethane-1,2-diamine)
| OtherNames = {{Unbulleted list|
N,N-Bis(2-aminoethyl)ethane-1,2-diamine
| TETA
| trien
| trientine (INN)
| trientine dihydrochloride
| MK-0681
}}
|Section1=
|Section2=
|Section3=
|Section5=
|Section9=
}}Triethylenetetramine (TETA and trien), also known as trientine''' (INN) when used medically, is an organic compound with the formula [CH2NHCH2CH2NH2]2. The pure freebase is a colorless oily liquid, but, like many amines, older samples assume a yellowish color due to impurities resulting from air-oxidation. It is soluble in polar solvents.  The branched isomer tris(2-aminoethyl)amine and piperazine derivatives may also be present in commercial samples of TETA.
The hydrochloride salts are used medically as a treatment for copper toxicity. 

Uses
Epoxy uses
The reactivity and uses of TETA are similar to those for the related polyamines ethylenediamine and diethylenetriamine.  It is primarily used as a crosslinker ("hardener") in epoxy curing. TETA, like other aliphatic amines, react quicker and at lower temperatures than aromatic amines due to less negative steric effects since the linear nature of the molecule provides it the ability to rotate and twist.

 Medical uses 

The hydrochloride salt of TETA, referred to as trientine hydrochloride, is a chelating agent that is used to bind and remove copper in the body to treat Wilson's disease, particularly in those who are intolerant to penicillamine. Some recommend trientine as first-line treatment, but experience with penicillamine is more extensive.

Trientine hydrochloride (brand name Syprine) was approved for medical use in the United States in November 1985.

Trientine tetrahydrochloride (brand name Cuprior) was approved for medical use in the European Union in September 2017. It is indicated for the treatment of Wilson's disease in adults, adolescents and children five years of age or older who are intolerant to D-penicillamine therapy.

Trientine dihydrochloride (brand name Cufence) was approved for medical use in the European Union in July 2019. It is indicated for the treatment of Wilson's disease in adults, adolescents and children five years of age or older who are intolerant to D-penicillamine therapy.

The most common side effects include nausea, especially when starting treatment, skin rash, duodenitis (inflammation of the duodenum, the part of the gut leading out of the stomach), and severe colitis (inflammation in the large bowel causing pain and diarrhea).

 Society and culture 
 Controversies 
In the United States, Valeant Pharmaceuticals International raised the price of its Syprine brand of TETA from $625 to $21,267 for 100 pills over five years. The New York Times'' said that this "egregious" price increase caused public outrage. Teva Pharmaceuticals developed a generic, which patients and doctors expected to be cheaper, but when it was introduced in February 2018, Teva's price was $18,375 for 100 pills. Aaron Kesselheim, who studies drug pricing at Harvard Medical School, said that drug companies price the product at what they think the market will bear.

Production
TETA is prepared by heating ethylenediamine or ethanolamine/ammonia mixtures over an oxide catalyst.  This process gives a variety of amines, especially ethylene amines which are separated by distillation and sublimation.

Coordination chemistry
TETA is a tetradentate ligand in coordination chemistry, where it is referred to as trien.  Octahedral complexes of the type M(trien)L2 can adopt several diastereomeric structures.

References

External links 
 
 
 

Ethyleneamines
Chelating agents
Orphan drugs
Tetradentate ligands
Secondary amines
X